The Standish Baronetcy, of Duxbury in the County of Lancaster, was a title in the Baronetage of England. It was created on 8 February 1677 for Richard Standish, subsequently Member of Parliament for Wigan. The title became extinct on the death of the third Baronet in 1812.

Standish baronets, of Duxbury (1677)
Sir Richard Standish, 1st Baronet (1653–1693)
Sir Thomas Standish, 2nd Baronet (died 1756)
Sir Frank Standish, 3rd Baronet (–1812)

References

Extinct baronetcies in the Baronetage of England
1677 establishments in England